Kahn (also known as Kahn-e Sabz and Kahn-e Seh) is a village in Kavirat Rural District, Chatrud District, Kerman County, Kerman Province, Iran. At the 2006 census, its population was 25, in 5 families.

References 

Populated places in Kerman County